Oka Antara (born Nyoman Oka Wisnupada Antara; 8 July 1981) is an Indonesian actor of Balinese descent. He is best known for starring in the films Sang Penari (2011), V/H/S/2 (2013), Killers (2014), and The Raid 2 (2014).

Life and career
Antara was born in Jakarta on 8 July 1981. He is of Balinese descent. Antara made his film debut in 2005 with Gue Kapok Jatuh Cinta (I Give Up on Falling in Love). One of the film's directors, Thomas Nawilis, asked him to write the film's soundtrack; Antara did so, and sang a duet with Sabria Kono entitled "So Special" for the film. After the film's success, Antara continued acting. In 2006 he played in Dunia Mereka (Their World), and the following year he was in Hantu (Ghost).

In 2008 he played Syaiful in Ayat-Ayat Cinta (Verses of Love), a film by Hanung Bramantyo; the part earned him a Citra Award nomination at the Indonesian Film Festival. The following year he appeared in another Bramantyo film, Perempuan Berkalung Sorban (Woman with a Turban); he considered the script very interesting, citing it as his reason for joining the cast. This role earned him an award for Best Supporting Actor at the 2009 Bandung Film Festival. That same year he played a Presidential Protection Squad member in Queen Bee, directed by Fajar Nugroho. For the role, he studied the squad's role from books and took training from a real-life member.

Antara earned another Best Actor award, this time at the Indonesian Movie Awards, for his role in 2010's Hari Untuk Amanda (Days for Amanda), which garnered him a nomination for the Citra Award for Best Leading Actor. Afterwards, the newspaper Kompas reported that he was taking a break from acting to write a film scenario.

In 2011, Antara was approached by producer Shanty Harmayn for the leading role of Rasus in Ifa Isfansyah's film Sang Penari (The Dancer). In preparing for the role as a malnourished young man, Antara cut back on his food intake; he later splurged when he had to play Rasus as a soldier. His acting in the role led to a Citra Award nomination for Best Actor, although he lost to Emir Mahira of Rumah Tanpa Jendela (House Without Windows).

Personal life
On 7 July 2008, Oka married Rara Wiritanaya, a TV presenter from Bali. They held a private wedding ceremony at home in Karangasem, Bali. The couple have 3 children.

He is a practicing Balinese Hindu and hailed from a tolerant but conservative Balinese Hindu family. Despite his religion and family background, he often get roles in Islamic films and soap operas. Due to this, there was an accidental incident involving him where an official mistakenly record his religion as Islam instead of Hindu, resulting on religious conversion rumor and drawn shock reaction to his family. The rumor had been dispelled after his clarification. 

He is a silat and kickboxing practitioner. His skills on these sports lead him role in Indonesian action movies.

Discography

Studio album 
 One Way (2004)

Filmography

Film

Television

Music video appearances

Awards and nominations

References

External links
 
 
 
 Oka Antara on Instagram

1981 births
Balinese people
Indonesian Hindus
Indonesian male actors
21st-century Indonesian male singers
Indonesian rappers
Living people
People from Jakarta